Excalibur Hotel and Casino is a casino hotel on the Las Vegas Strip in Paradise, Nevada, in the United States. It is owned by Vici Properties and operated by MGM Resorts International.

Excalibur, named for the mythical sword of King Arthur, uses the medieval theme in several ways. Its facade is a stylized image of a castle (see also: List of castles in the United States). Until 2007, a wizard-like figure representing Merlin looked out from a high turret (since replaced by a figure advertising Dick's Last Resort).

Excalibur is situated at the Tropicana – Las Vegas Boulevard intersection. The hotel is linked by overhead pedestrian bridges to neighboring casinos to the north (New York-New York, across Tropicana Avenue) and to the east (Tropicana, across the Strip). A free tram connects Excalibur to its sister MGM Resorts International properties to the south, Luxor and Mandalay Bay.

History
The land on which the Excalibur sits was originally the proposed site of the Xanadu Resort envisioned in 1975. The 1,730 room Asian-tropical-themed resort would have been the first mega-resort in Las Vegas.  The project was never built when the developers could not secure a deal with the county on the sewer infrastructure such a large project would have required.

Circus Circus Enterprises constructed Excalibur which opened on June 19, 1990, as the largest resort hotel in the world, with almost 4,000 rooms covering over 70 acres. As of 2016 it is the seventh-largest hotel (by total number of rooms) in Las Vegas, and the thirteenth-largest hotel worldwide. MGM Resorts International purchased the property in 2005.

Excalibur was designed in line with the "theme resort" strategy popular among some casino operators during the 1990s, which included the traditional Las Vegas gaming experience coupled with family-oriented elements. However, since 2006 most of the medieval-themed statues and scenery have been removed as part of a four-year renovation and modernization project. As of 2010, few of the themed wall murals still remained as Excalibur was updated to include more modern and understated elements, including contemporary furniture and flat-screen plasma TVs in 2,000 renovated guest rooms.

On March 21, 2003, Josh Ford of Los Angeles hit the largest Megabucks Jackpot to date of US$39.7 million at Excalibur.

Ownership of the Excalibur, along with many other MGM properties, was transferred to MGM Growth Properties in 2016, while MGM Resorts continued to operate it under a lease agreement. Vici Properties acquired MGM Growth, including the Excalibur, in 2022.

Facilities and attractions

The  gaming area at Excalibur consists of table games and more than 1,200 slot machines. In addition to casino space, the Excalibur resort includes a renovated pool area, a  spa and fitness center, eight restaurants and a food court, the Chapel at Excalibur, and the Octane Lounge & The Lounge with live music on the weekends, and an arcade.

In May 1999, the casino partnered with World Championship Wrestling to open the WCW Nitro Grill, which was the first professional wrestling themed restaurant and nightclub in the United States; the restaurant was frequently visited by numerous professional wrestlers. WCW Nitro Grill operated for 16 months before closing in September 2000 due in part to WCW's financial problems; the restaurant's current space would later be occupied by a Dick's Last Resort location, where it remains to this day.

Excalibur is home to three permanent shows: the all-male revue Thunder From Down Under, The Australian Bee Gees Show, a tribute to the Bee Gees and the medieval-themed dinner show Tournament of Kings. Thunder From Down Under moved to Excalibur in July 2001 and since then has received recognition as one of the best all-male strip shows in Las Vegas. In 2006, the performance space was renamed the "Thunder From Down Under Showroom" in honor of the troupe. Tournament of Kings is a medieval jousting tournament performed with 12 breeds of horses and 32 cast members in a 925-seat amphitheater called King Arthur's Arena. The show includes a banquet feast served by a costumed serf or wench and is meant to be eaten without utensils. Tournament of Kings debuted along with the opening of Excalibur in 1990.

Dick's Last Resort restaurant opened at Excalibur in June 2007. Dick's is known for its unusual dining experience in which servers purposefully act obnoxious towards guests. Employee "Taco" is considered Dick's mascot and entertains guests with his own version of the Bellagio fountain show using water dispensers behind the bar.

Excalibur's food court housed one of the few McDonald's in the world to vend Pepsi instead of Coke until the restaurant closed in early 2016.

The fun dungeon is an arcade from which you can access the Tournament of Kings arena, and also includes a laser tag arena.

In 1993, the Excalibur introduced a new attraction featuring a 71 foot animatronic dragon fighting with Merlin in the moat of the castle. Every day between 6 p.m. and midnight, visitors could watch the mechanical puppets designed by Alvaro Villa's AVG Entertainment. The hourly show, which had been awarded the "Worst Attraction" accolade by Las Vegas Review-Journal twice, was discontinued in 2004.

In popular culture
Excalibur has been featured in several video game and television productions since opening in 1990. Excalibur itself, or a hotel resembling Excalibur, makes appearances in the video games Driver 2 and Grand Theft Auto: San Andreas. In television productions, Excalibur was the setting for a stunt on the Las Vegas edition of Fear Factor and was featured in an episode of South Park called "It Hits the Fan". Also, season six of Top Chef contestant Jennifer used Excalibur as the inspiration for one of her meals. The mobile game Fate/Grand Order's 2019 summer event is set in Las Vegas and takes place at a fictional casino modeled after Excalibur called "Camelot & Co.", run by Merlin and Altria, the series' gender-flipped version of King Arthur.

Gallery

Interior

References

External links

 Excalibur Hotel and Casino website
 "Roy Vegas" - photos showing the Dick's Last Resort promotion that replaced Merlin

1990 establishments in Nevada
Cultural depictions of Arthurian legend
Casino hotels
Casinos completed in 1990
Casinos in the Las Vegas Valley
Hotel buildings completed in 1990
Hotels established in 1990
Las Vegas Strip
Mandalay Resort Group
MGM Resorts International
Novelty buildings in Nevada
Resorts in the Las Vegas Valley
Skyscraper hotels in Paradise, Nevada